An Jong-Ho  is a North Korean footballer who plays as a midfielder.

References 

Living people
1987 births
North Korean footballers
North Korea international footballers
Footballers at the 2006 Asian Games

Association football midfielders
Asian Games competitors for North Korea